Al-Hubariyah (Arabic: الهباريـة) is a Syrian village in the Qatana District of the Rif Dimashq Governorate. According to the Syria Central Bureau of Statistics (CBS), Al-Hubariyah had a population of 711 in the 2004 census.

References

External links

Populated places in Qatana District